The 2002 Skate Canada International was the second event of six in the 2002–03 ISU Grand Prix of Figure Skating, a senior-level international invitational competition series. It was held at the Colisée Pepsi in Quebec City, Quebec on October 31 – November 3. Medals were awarded in the disciplines of men's singles, ladies' singles, pair skating, and ice dancing. Skaters earned points toward qualifying for the 2002–03 Grand Prix Final.

Results

Men

Ladies

Pairs

Ice dancing

External links
 2002 Skate Canada International

Skate Canada International, 2002
Skate Canada International
2002 in Canadian sports 
2002 in Quebec